Chestnut Lodge (formerly known as Woodlawn Hotel) was a historic building in Rockville, Maryland, United States, well known as a psychiatric institution.  It was a contributing property to the West Montgomery Avenue Historic District.

History

Early History 
During the construction of the building, Willson filed for bankruptcy, and the unfinished building was bought for $6000 by Mary J. Colley (the owner of the Clarendon Hotel in Washington DC) and her partner Charles W. Bell. Under their ownership, the building was opened as the Woodlawn Hotel in the spring of 1889. The hotel boasted electric bells, gas lighting and 40 luxurious guest rooms and was extremely successful, catering to rich visitors from Washington DC who often boarded in the hotel during the summer months.

After a decade or so of prosperity, however, the fortunes of the Woodlawn Hotel declined as many of its semi-permanent residents moved into new houses in Rockville. In 1906, the hotel's owners were heavily in debt and were forced to sell the building and grounds at public auction.

Psychiatric Hospital 
The hotel was purchased by Dr. Ernest Luther Bullard (1859–1931), a native of Milwaukee, Wisconsin, a surgeon and professor of psychiatry and neurology. Bullard renovated the building and re-opened it in 1910 as a sanatorium for the care of nervous and mental diseases, renaming it Chestnut Lodge after the 125 chestnut trees that grew in the grounds.

For many years, Bullard was the sole physician working at the Lodge, but over the next 75 years a total of three generations of the Bullard family operated the private hospital. Many nationally renowned therapists, including psychoanalytic psychiatrist Clarence Edward Bunge, MD, Frieda Fromm-Reichmann, Wayne Fenton, Thomas McGlashan, Harold Searles, and Otto Allen Will Jr., worked at the hospital over the years.  The hospital was the site for a series of influential studies on the long-term treatment outcome for psychiatric conditions, known as the Chestnut Lodge studies.

In the 1950s and 1960s, innovative dance therapist Marian Chace had regularly scheduled sessions with groups of patients. Judith Richardson Bunney followed her in this work. In the 1960s and 1970s, Donn B. Murphy conducted a drama group for patients. One of the core therapeutic features of Chestnut Lodge was to encourage there individuality of both patient and staff. This was found to have stimulated creativity and both groups benefitted by overcoming pressures to conform.

The psychiatric work performed at Chestnut Lodge was detailed in the 1954 book, "The Mental Hospital." The book provides insight into both the positive and negative aspects of mental health treatment at the time. Written by three psychiatrists, the work delves into many of the invisible forces influencing patient and staff interaction.

In 1980, Dr. Rafael Osheroff, a nephrologist and father of three, sued Chestnut Lodge for negligence. In his complaint, Osheroff claimed that "the staff failed to prescribe drugs and instead treated him according to the psychodynamic and social model.” The lawsuit was settles in 1987. 

In 1997, the lodge was purchased by CPC Health, and passed hands again to the Washington Waldorf School in 2001 when CPC Health declared bankruptcy. In December 2003, the property was conveyed to Chestnut Lodge Properties, Inc.

Conversion to condominiums 
In 2008, the property was approved for conversion to condominiums (inside the main building) and upscale housing. The grove of chestnut trees and some original building façades were to be preserved. But at around 3:00 a.m. on June 7, 2009, the building was destroyed by a fire. Montgomery County Fire Rescue spokesman Pete Piringer says the unoccupied, multi-story brick structure collapsed in the Sunday morning blaze. He said the building was unoccupied and no one was injured. The cause of the fire was not immediately known.

References

External links
 Peerless Rockville
 Essay with pictures

Hotel buildings completed in 1889
Buildings and structures in Rockville, Maryland
Psychiatric hospitals in Maryland
Historic district contributing properties in Maryland
Hospitals established in 1910
1910 establishments in Maryland
Defunct hospitals in Maryland
National Register of Historic Places in Montgomery County, Maryland
Hotel buildings on the National Register of Historic Places in Maryland
Hospital buildings on the National Register of Historic Places in Maryland